Rasa may refer to:

Indian culture 
 Rasa (aesthetics), a concept in the Indian performing arts
 Rasa (theology), a concept of nectar or emotional rapture related to Krishna devotion
 Rasā, a mythical river mentioned in the Rigveda
 Rasa lila, a dance performed by the Hindu god Krishna with his consort Radha and other milkmaids
 Rasa (literary form), an early literary form of Gujarati literature and Apabhramsa
 Rasa, the nutritive fluid that flows in the body and nourishes all other tissues according to Ayurveda

People 
 Rasa Budbergytė (born 1960), a politician of the Social Democratic Party of Lithuania 
 Rasa Drazdauskaitė (born 1981), a Lithuanian long-distance runner
 Rasa Juknevičienė (born 1958), a Lithuanian politician
 Rasa Kaušiūtė (born 1977), Lithuanian singer and composer
 Rasa Mažeikytė (born 1976), a Lithuanian cyclist
 Rasa Polikevičiūtė (born 1970), a Lithuanian cycle racer

Places 
 Rasa Island, in Palawan, Philippines
 Rasa Island, Japan, the old name of Oki Daitō, an uninhabited Japanese island
 Raša, Istria County, a town in Croatia
 Rasa, Malaysia, a town in Selangor, Malaysia
 Raša (river), a river in Istria, Croatia
 Rasa (Argeș), a river in southern Romania
 Rasa, a village in Grădiștea, Călărași, Romania
 Rasa, Ticino, a hamlet in the Swiss canton of Ticino
 Rasa di Varese, a hamlet in the Italian province of Varese
 Rasa, the former name of Lhasa, Tibet

Other uses 
 Rasa (band), a musical duo formed in 1998
 Rasa (mythology), a Lithuanian goddess
 Rasa, one of several Lithuanian names for Saint Jonas' Festival
 Tabula rasa, an epistemological thesis
 Rasa, a character in Mobile Suit Gundam 00
 Relative accessible surface area, a measure of residue solvent exposure
 Relative apparent synapomorphy analysis, a taxonomy term
 Roosevelt Academy Student Association, Student Association of Liberal Arts Honors College in Middelburg, The Netherlands
 Rasa (restaurant), a restaurant in Burlingame, California

See also 
 Rasah, a town in Negeri Sembilan, Malaysia
 Rassa (disambiguation)
 Raza (disambiguation)
 Ras (disambiguation)
 Raas (disambiguation)

Lithuanian feminine given names